Gopjan is a census town in the Berhampore CD block in the Berhampore subdivision of the Murshidabad district in the state of West Bengal, India.

Geography

Location                                

Area overview
The area shown in the map alongside, covering Berhampore and Kandi subdivisions, is spread across both the natural physiographic regions of the district, Rarh and Bagri. The headquarters of Murshidabad district, Berhampore, is in this area. The entire area is overwhelmingly rural with over 80% of the population living in the rural areas.

Note: The map alongside presents some of the notable locations in the subdivisions. All places marked in the map are linked in the larger full screen map.

Demographics
According to the 2011 Census of India, Gopjan had a total population of 23,415, of which 11,924 (51%) were males and 11,491 (49%) were females. Population in the age range 0–6 years was 2,744. The total number of literate persons in Gopjan was 15,925 (77.04% of the population 6 years).

Infrastructure
According to the District Census Handbook, Murshidabad,  2011, Gopjan covered an area of 9.6248 km2. It had 15 km roads with open drains. The protected water-supply involved overhead tank, tap water from treated source, hand pump. It had 2,239 domestic electric connections, 95 road lighting points. Among the medical facilities it had 2 nursing homes. Among the educational facilities, it had 8 primary schools, 3 middle schools, 2 secondary schools, 1 senior secondary school. Among the social, cultural and recreational facilities, it had 1 public library, 1 reading room. It had branch offices of 1 nationalised bank, 1 co-operative bank.

Healthcare 
Berhampore CD block is one of the areas of Murshidabad district where ground water is affected by high level of arsenic contamination. The WHO guideline for arsenic in drinking water is 10 mg/ litre, and the Indian Standard value is 50 mg/ litre. The maximum concentration in Berhampore CD block is 635 mg/litre.

References

Cities and towns in Murshidabad district